Sin is a 1915 American silent drama film written and directed by Herbert Brenon and starring Theda Bara. It was produced by Fox Film Corporation and shot at the Fox Studio in Fort Lee, New Jersey. The film is now considered to be lost.

Cast
 Theda Bara as Rosa
 William E. Shay as Luigi
 Warner Oland as Pietro
 Henry Leone as Giovanni
 Louise Rial as Maria

Reception
In order to underscore and further enhance Theda Bara's image as a "vamp", Fox Film Corporation publicized the film with the tagline "Sin With Theda Bara!". Upon its release, Sin was an enormous hit with audiences and Bara earned generally good reviews for her performance. Despite its success in other locations, the film was banned in Ohio and Georgia due to its themes of suicide, lust, Roman Catholic sacrilege, and love triangles. The Pittsburgh Board of Welfare condemned the film as did the Kansas Board of Censorship, although the latter apparently still allowed the film's presentation in Kansas theaters.

See also
List of lost films
1937 Fox vault fire
List of Fox Film films

References

External links

1915 films
1915 drama films
1915 lost films
Fox Film films
Silent American drama films
American silent feature films
American black-and-white films
Films directed by Herbert Brenon
Films shot in Fort Lee, New Jersey
Lost American films
Lost drama films
1910s American films